In mathematics the division polynomials provide a way to calculate multiples of points on elliptic curves and to study the fields generated by torsion points. They play a central role in the study of counting points on elliptic curves in Schoof's algorithm.

Definition 

 

  

 

 

The polynomial  is called the nth division polynomial.

Properties 
 The division polynomials form a generic elliptic divisibility sequence over the ring .
If an elliptic curve  is given in the Weierstrass form  over some field , i.e.

Let  be prime and let  be an elliptic curve over the finite field , i.e., .

René Schoof observed that working modulo the th division polynomial allows one to work with all -torsion points simultaneously. This is heavily used in Schoof's algorithm for counting points on elliptic curves.

See also 
Schoof's algorithm

References 
A. Enge: Elliptic Curves and their Applications to Cryptography: An Introduction. Kluwer Academic Publishers, Dordrecht, 1999.
N. Koblitz: A Course in Number Theory and Cryptography, Graduate Texts in Math. No. 114, Springer-Verlag, 1987. Second edition, 1994
Müller : Die Berechnung der Punktanzahl von elliptischen kurvenüber endlichen Primkörpern. Master's Thesis. Universität  des Saarlandes, Saarbrücken, 1991.
Available at http://www-math.mit.edu/~musiker/schoof.pdf
Schoof: Elliptic Curves over Finite Fields and the Computation of Square Roots mod p. Math. Comp., 44(170):483–494, 1985. Available at http://www.mat.uniroma2.it/~schoof/ctpts.pdf
R. Schoof: Counting Points on Elliptic Curves over Finite Fields. J. Theor. Nombres Bordeaux 7:219–254, 1995. Available at http://www.mat.uniroma2.it/~schoof/ctg.pdf
L. C. Washington: Elliptic Curves: Number Theory and Cryptography. Chapman & Hall/CRC, New York, 2003.
J. Silverman: The Arithmetic of Elliptic Curves, Springer-Verlag, GTM 106, 1986.

Polynomials
Algebraic curves